Jessica Kairé (born 1980) is a Guatemalan artist. She is based in New York and Guatemala.

Early life 
Jessica Kairé is a Jewish Guatemalan artist. She was born in 1980. Kairé moved to New York where she currently lives and continues to create art works. Kairé studied at Escuela Nacional de Artes Plásticas in Guatemala and at Hunter College in New York where she earned her Bachelor of Arts degree in 2010.

Works

Confort Series 
The Confort Series is a series of soft sculptures that represent various weapons. Kairé created this series in 2009 in response to the violence in her home country. She used color fabric to create these weapons so that the viewers can get familiarized with them and not feel so intimidated by them. Some of the weapons that she included are:

Hand Grenades
 Batons
 Plush brass knuckles
 Handgun
 Ammunition box

Así es la Vida en el Trópico (Such is Life in The Tropics) 
Así es la Vida en el Trópico ("Such is the Life in The Tropics") is a series of instructional videos including one small sculpture in which Kairé demonstrates how to create weapons out of various tropical produce. The sculpture is a ninja star-like weapon made out of paper and acrylic paint to make it look like a banana. 

The first video in the series shows the audience how to make nunchucks using two bananas and banana leaves to bind them together. In the second video, Kairé shows how to make mace using cassava and a horned melon. She begins by making a hole on the bottom of the horned melon in which she then inserts the cassava. In the third video, she shows how to make a slingshot using rubber bands, banana peels, and orange peels. The rubber bands are tied to the orange peels and the banana peels; the objects are placed in the orange peel. This piece was another response to the violence in Guatemala.

Oy! 
Oy! is a performance art piece in which Kairé sits on a chair and attempts to place as many Kippots as possible on her head. She uses this piece to express her Jewish background.

Shiva 
Shiva is a series of installations in which Kairé puts a white fabric over various mirrors with a plaque underneath telling passers by not to look at themselves in the mirror.

Can You Hear Me? 
Can You Hear Me? is a performance piece in which the audience has a video call with someone in a different location through Skype. During the call, participants share the same meal that the people on the other side of the screen are eating.

Tastings 
Tastings are a series of installations in which she creates casts of the architecture surrounding the area and then uses the cast to mold edible things such as bread and chocolate.

Exhibitions 
NuMu The Nuevo Museo De Arte Contemporáneo (NuMu) is an egg-shaped kiosk repurposed by both Kairé and Stefan Benchoam that has been turned into a small museum that displays contemporary artworks in Guatemala City. The kiosk was used to sell eggs by its previous owner until Kairé rented it. NuMu was created to combat Guatemala's lack of contemporary art exhibitions.

References 

1980 births
Living people
21st-century women artists
Guatemalan women sculptors
Hunter College alumni